Gravity's Angels is a collection of science fiction stories by American writer Michael Swanwick. It was released in 1991, and was the author's first book published by Arkham House. It was published in an edition of 4,119 copies. The stories originally appeared in Isaac Asimov's Science Fiction Magazine, Omni, and other magazines.

Contents

Gravity's Angels contains the following stories:

 "A Midwinter's Tale"
 "The Feast of Saint Janis"
 "The Blind Minotaur"
 "The Transmigration of Philip K"
 "Covenant of Souls"
"The Dragon Line"
 "Mummer Kiss"
 "Trojan Horse"
 "Snow Angels"
 "The Man Who Met Picasso"
 "Foresight"
 "Ginungagap"
 "The Edge of the World"

Sources
 
 
 

1991 short story collections
Books illustrated by Janet Aulisio
Books with cover art by Pablo Picasso
Short story collections by Michael Swanwick
Arkham House books